"Everything" is a song recorded by Japanese pop boy band Arashi. It was released on July 1, 2009 through their record label J Storm. "Everything" was used as the theme song for the au by KDDI commercials, featuring Arashi as the endorsers. It was released as a CD single in two formats: a regular edition and a limited edition. While both editions comes with the B-side song "Season", the former comes with the instrumental of all the songs, while the latter comes a DVD.

Chart performance
The single sold over 340,000 copies in its first week, topping the Oricon weekly singles chart. Until the release of the group's twenty-eighth single "My Girl", "Everything" held the third highest position for first-week sales for singles of 2009. By selling a total of 423,004 copies by the end of 2009, "Everything" is officially the fifth best-selling single of 2009 in Japan.

The single is certified Platinum by the Recording Industry Association of Japan (RIAJ) for a shipment of 250,000 copies in Japan.

Track listing

Charts and certifications

Weekly charts

Year-end charts

Certifications

Release history

References

External links
 "Everything" product information

Arashi songs
2009 singles
Oricon Weekly number-one singles
Billboard Japan Hot 100 number-one singles
2009 songs
J Storm singles